Pseudotetracha canninga is a species of tiger beetle in the subfamily Cicindelinae that was described by McCairns, Freitag, Rose & McDonald in 1997. It is endemic to Australia.

References

Beetles described in 1997
Endemic fauna of Australia
Beetles of Australia